Christopher Dowdall was a 15th-century Archdeacon of Meath, serving from 1489 to 1498.

Notes

Archdeacons of Meath
15th-century Irish Roman Catholic priests